Ahmet Ahmedani (born 15 January 1949) is an Albanian footballer. He played in one match for the Albania national football team in 1976.

References

External links
 

1949 births
Living people
Albanian men's footballers
Albania international footballers
Place of birth missing (living people)
Association football goalkeepers
FK Dinamo Tirana players